Felicja Schabińska (20 November 1909 – 5 June 1996) was a Polish hurdler. She competed in the women's 80 metres hurdles at the 1932 Summer Olympics.

References

External links
 

1909 births
1996 deaths
Athletes (track and field) at the 1932 Summer Olympics
Polish female hurdlers
Olympic athletes of Poland
Athletes from Warsaw
People from Warsaw Governorate